Mompha conturbatella, also known as the fireweed mompha moth, is a moth in the family Momphidae found in Asia, Europe and North America. It was first described by Jacob Hübner in 1819.

Distribution and habitat
This species has a Holarctic distribution. In the Palearctic, it is found from Europe through the Caucasus and central Asia to the Russian Far East. The species is also common in North America. These moths mainly occur in mountains, woodland, hedge rows and marshy areas.

Description
Mompha conturbatella has a wingspan of 11–17 mm. Forewings of these moths show stains of various color, ranging from brown to black, bluish, russet and white. On the dorsum are present several raised tufts of scales.

Biology
Mompha conturbatella is a univoltine species. Adults are on wing from June to July. They feed on nectar of hogweed (Heracleum sphondylium) and rosebay willowherb or fireweed (Epilobium angustifolium).

The larvae feed on fireweed, dwarf fireweed (Epilobium latifolium) (and possibly broad-leaved willowherb (Epilobium montanum) ). Larvae can be found from May to June. At the end of spring, the larvae live between spun together leaves at the tip of the plant and later into the stem. Pupation takes place in a yellowish brown cocoon in litter on the ground.

References

External links
 Lepiforum e. V.
 North America Moth Photographer Group

Momphidae
Moths of Asia
Moths of Europe
Moths of North America
Taxa named by Jacob Hübner